The Film Festival Cologne (formerly: Cologne Conference) is an international Film and Television Festival that takes place annually in Cologne, Germany. With about 10.000 visitors, the Film Festival Cologne is considered as the best attended festival of its kind worldwide. Screenings of independent films as well as debates on media politics and media aesthetic complement the event.

History
The Cologne Conference was founded in 1991 by journalist and media researcher Lutz Hachmeister while he was the head of the Adolf-Grimme-Institut. In addition to the Grimme-Preis, a national award, an international television festival was originated.

The TV festival was part of German media convention mediaforum nrw; but it soon developed a momentum of its own and an international reputation. In 1993, the competitive festival section "TopTen" was established, which was, in 2001, divided into two sections, one section for fictional TV and one for documentary TV. In 2007, these two categories were recombined to one category, the "TopTen" section. In the same year, the second competitive festival section "Look", which presents visually extraordinary film and television productions, was created. In 2009, the competitive festival section "Kino" has also become a part of the Cologne Conference. The "Kino" section offers the most interesting aspects concerning film. The presentations and discussions within the Cologne Conference "Lectures" examine the relevant developments on the media market. Beyond that, a workshop discussion with the winner of the "Cologne Film Award" has become an inherent part of the "Lectures" since 2007. Furthermore, there are retrospectives and revivals of legendary television programmes, such as The Monkees, Twin Peaks or The Prisoner.

Programme and Guests
One of the first TV productions presented at the Cologne Conference was David Lynch's mystery series Twin Peaks. Later almost all groundbreaking US TV series had their German premiere at the Cologne Conference, e.g. Emergency Room, Sex and the City or 24. Also British television always enjoyed strong presence, for instance with Cracker, The Office or Prime Suspect.

Besides German film and television stars, international celebrities such as Academy Award winners Paul Haggis, Florian Henckel von Donnersmarck and Michael Radford, Anton Corbijn, Nicolas Roeg, D.A. Pennebaker and Chris Hegedus, Mika Kaurismäki, Ole Bornedal, David Lynch, Todd Haynes, Paul Abbott or Tarsem Singh presented themselves in Cologne.

Competition and awards
From roughly 800 international submissions, a jury selects the programmes for the festival sections "TopTen", "Look" and "Kino".
Since 1997, the Cologne Conference awards prizes in different categories. The TV Spielfilm Award, donated by the identically named TV program magazine, is given to the best contribution of the three festival sections. Furthermore, the German Casting Award goes to the best German casting agent and The Hollywood Reporter Award, sponsored by The Nielsen Company, goes to young and aspiring individuals in the media sector.
Until 2007, the award for the best screenplay, sponsored by Network Movie, was also bestowed.  Amongst others, it was given to Florian Henckel von Donnersmarck in 2006, who won the Oscar for The Lives of Others in 2007.

In 2007 the main award of the Cologne Conference, the "Cologne Film Award", was originated. This award honors outstanding creativity in film and TV and is worth EUR 25.000. It is bestowed to those individuals, who best contribute "to the further development of the language of film and media". The award is presented by the Cologne Conference, along with the City of Cologne and States Film Subsidy Body "Filmstiftung NRW". The first laureate of the "Cologne Film Award" in 2007 was  Canadian film director and writer Paul Haggis (LA Crash, Casino Royale) and in 2008, the award was given to the brothers Luc and Jean-Pierre Dardenne (L'Enfant, Lorna's Silence). In 2009, the award was bestowed to Roman Polanski (Chinatown, The Pianist) but the Polish/French movie director was not able to receive the prize on 3 October in Cologne since he was arrested on 26 September during his journey to the Zurich Film Festival, which caused a worldwide sensation. In 2010 David Lynch was presented with the "Cologne Film Award" for his groundbreaking work in television and cinema. David Simon received the TV Spielfilm Award for his critically acclaimed series Treme. Todd Haynes was awarded the TV Spielfilm Award in 2011 for his extraordinary re-imagination of Mildred Pierce and the Cologne Film Award was presented to Tarsem Singh.

Laureates 2004
 Casting Award: Rita Kes
 Producer Award: Stefan Schubert and Ralph Schwingel
 Writer's Award: Michael Gutmann
 TV Spielfilm Award: David Yates for State of Play
 Phoenix Award: One Shot Productions Ltd.

Laureates 2007
 Cologne Film Award: Paul Haggis
 TV Spielfilm Award: Anton Corbijn for the movie Control
 Writer's Award: Hannah Hollinger for her lifework
 The Hollywood Reporter Award: Das perfekte Dinner
In 2007, the Cologne Conference was chaired by festival founder Lutz Hachmeister, along with Maybritt Illner, Stefan Aust, Marc Conrad, Michael Schmid-Ospach and Dieter Gorny.

Laureates 2008 
 Cologne Film Award: Jean-Pierre Dardenne and Luc Dardenne
 TV Spielfilm Award: Abi Morgan and Hettie Macdonald for the BBC movie White Girl
 German Casting Award: Franziska Aigner-Kuhn for the movie Die Welle
 The Hollywood Reporter Award: Christian Becker, Rat Pack film production
 Future TV Award: Sex and Zaziki by Sascha Jenschewski and Alexander Perschel
In 2008, the Cologne Conference was chaired by Lutz Hachmeister, along with, Stefan Aust, Marc Conrad, Michael Schmid-Ospach and Dieter Gorny.

Laureates 2009 
 Cologne Film Award: Roman Polanski
 TV Spielfilm Award: Lynda La Plante (Above Suspicion, ITV)
 The Hollywood Reporter Award: Max Wiedemann and Quirin Berg, Wiedemann & Berg Filmproduktion
 Casting Award: Nina Haun
In 2009, the Cologne Conference was chaired by festival founder Lutz Hachmeister, along with Stefan Aust, Marc Conrad, Michael Schmid-Ospach and Dieter Gorny.

Laureates 2010 
 Cologne Film Award: David Lynch
 TV Spielfilm Award: David Simon for the HBO series Treme
 The Hollywood Reporter Award: Jon Hamm and Elisabeth Moss for the AMC-series Mad Men
 Casting Award: Ulrike Müller for her casting work in the feature films When We Leave, Im Schatten and The City Below

Laureates 2011 
 Cologne Film Award: Tarsem Singh
 TV Spielfilm Award: Todd Haynes for the HBO series Mildred Pierce
 The Hollywood Reporter Award: Paul Abbott for the series Shameless and Exile.
 Casting Award: Sophie Molitoris for her casting work in the TV Movie .

Laureates 2012 
 Cologne Film Award: François Ozon
 TV Spielfilm Award: Michael Winterbottom for the movie Trishna.
 The Hollywood Reporter Award: Karl Baumgartner, for his lifework.

Laureates 2013 
 Cologne Film Award: Harmony Korine
 TV Spielfilm Award: Frauke Finsterwalder for the film Finsterworld
 The Hollywood Reporter Award: Sibel Kekilli
 Casting Award: Susanne Ritter
 International Actors Award: Isabelle Huppert

Laureates 2014 

 Cologne Film Award: Lars von Trier[8]
 TV Spielfilm Award: Bertrand Tavernier für den Film Quai d'Orsay
 The Hollywood Reporter Award: Tom Tykwer
 international actors award.cologne: Martina Gedeck

Laureates 2015 

 Cologne Film Award: Paolo Sorrentino
 TV Spielfilm Award: David Schalko für die Serie Altes Geld
 The Hollywood Reporter Award: Mathieu Amalric
 international actors award.cologne: Nora von Waldstätten
 phoenix Award: Joshua Oppenheimer

Laureates 2016 

 Cologne Film Award: Claire Denis
 NRW Film Award for the best documentary: Family Business (Regie: Christiane Büchner, Produktion: Tobias Büchner, Büchner.Filmproduktion)
 NRW Film Award for the best movie: Toni Erdmann (Regie: Maren Ade, Produktion: Janine Jackowski, Jonas Dornbach, Maren Ade, Komplizen Film)
 TV Spielfilm Award: Lucie Borleteau für die Serie Cannabis
 The Hollywood Reporter Award: Christopher Doyle
 international actors award.cologne: Peter Simonischek
 phoenix Award: Pieter-Jan De Pue

Laureates 2017 

 Cologne Film Award: Jane Campion
 NRW Film Award for the best documentary: Peter Handke – Bin im Wald. Kann sein, dass ich mich verspäte... (Regie: Corinna Belz, Produktion: Thomas Kufus, zero one film)
 NRW Film Award for the best movie: Der traumhafte Weg (Regie: Angela Schanelec)
 TV Spielfilm Award: Margarethe von Trotta für Forget About Nick
 The Hollywood Reporter Award: Sean Bean
 International Actors Award: Juliette Binoche
 phoenix Award: Kevin Macdonald

Laureates 2018 

 Cologne Film Award: Luca Guadagnino
 NRW Film Award for the best documentary: Lucica und ihre sechs Kinder (Regie/Produktion: Bettina Braun)
 NRW Film Award for the best movie: Wintermärchen (Produktion: Bettina Brokemper, Regie: Jan Bonny)
 The Hollywood Reporter Award: Paweł Pawlikowski
 International Actors Award: Lars Eidinger
 phoenix Award: Chris Martin (britischer TV-Journalist und Filmemacher)[9]

References

External links
Official Website Cologne Conference

Film festivals in Germany
Festivals in Cologne
1991 establishments in Germany
Recurring events established in 1991
Annual events in Germany